WLNQ (104.7 FM) is a radio station broadcasting a country music format.  Licensed to White Pine, Tennessee, United States, the station is currently owned by Bristol Broadcasting Company, Inc. Serving Hamblen and surrounding counties in east Tennessee.

Programming

Monday-Friday
"Your Hometown Country Station" overnights (12 a.m. - 6 a.m.)
"Cody" (6 a.m. - 10 a.m.)
"Radio Robin Keith" mid-days (10 a.m. - 3 p.m.)
"Mark Ryan" (3 p.m. - 7 p.m.)
"Jason" (7 p.m. - 12 a.m.)

Saturday
"Your Hometown Country Station" overnights (12 a.m. - 6 a.m.)
"Robin Keith" (6 a.m. - Noon)
"Dale Jones" (Noon - 6 p.m.)
"Cody" (6 p.m. - Midnight)

Sunday
"Your Hometown Country Station" am hours (12 a.m. - 11 a.m.)
"American Country Countdown" mid-days (11 a.m. - 3 p.m.)
"Robin Keith" (3 p.m. - 8 p.m.)
"American Country Countdown" evenings (8 p.m. - 12 a.m.)

References

External links

Country radio stations in the United States
LNQ
Jefferson County, Tennessee